Ramachandra is a 2003 Indian Tamil-language action film, directed by Raj Kapoor, starring Sathyaraj and Vijayalakshmi. The film was released on 15 January 2003. It is a remake of the 1995 Telugu film Khaidi Inspector.

Plot

Ramachandran (Sathyaraj) is a police inspector who is sentenced to the death penalty. His teammates release him in secret and Ramachandran begins by killing the criminals one by one.

Cast

Sathyaraj as Inspector  Ramachandran
Pandiarajan as Thirunavukkarasu
Vijayalakshmi as Divya, Ramachandran's wife
Ashish Vidyarthi as "Sodukku" Chockalingam
Srikanth as Chief Minister
Vennira Aadai Moorthy as Chockalingam's assistant
Chandrasekhar as Sivarama Gandhi
Delhi Ganesh as Ramachandran's father
Livingston as Jeevarathnam / Sathyamoorthy
Raj Kapoor as Naagaa
Sriman as Suresh Kumar
Ponnambalam as Kabaali, Chockalingam's henchman
Pandu as Rajagopal
G. M. Kumar as DSP Kumar
Mahanadi Shankar as Sub-inspector
Thalapathy Dinesh as Chockalingam's henchman
Vinayak as Vijay
Kovai Senthil
Sivanarayanamoorthy
Deepa Venkat as Deepa
Abhinayashree as Sandhya, Suresh Kumar's sister
Mumtaj Pakoda Kadhar as Sub-inspector's wife
Baby Shathika as Ammukutty
LIC Narasimhan as Judge
Lekhasri in a special appearance
Radhika Chaudhari in a special appearance
Nagendra Prasad in a special appearance - "Paarappa"

Awards
2003 Tamil Nadu State Film Awards

Tamil Nadu State Film Award for Best Male Playback Singer –  P. Unni Krishnan

Soundtrack

The film score and the soundtrack were composed by Deva. The soundtrack, released in 2003, features 5 tracks with lyrics written by Pa. Vijay and Ponniyin Selvan.

Reception
Rediff wrote: "this film is aimed purely at the B and C categories". Hindu wrote: "Writer-director Raj Kapoor sees to it that Ramachandra's reckless, impulsive ventures only lead to mindless melee and every time you expect some intelligent counters from him, he lets you down very badly". Balaji B wrote: "The movie soon turns us off with its violence, cliches and chaos before becoming even worse and entering into virtually unwatchable territory".

References

2003 films
2000s Tamil-language films
Indian action films
Tamil remakes of Telugu films
2000s masala films
Fictional portrayals of the Tamil Nadu Police
Films scored by Deva (composer)
2003 action films